sieverts (symbol: Sv) is plural for the SI unit of equivalent absorbed radiation dose

Sieverts may also refer to:
 Adolf Sieverts (1874–1947), German chemist
Sieverts's law, rule to predict the solubility of gases in metals
 Rudolf Sieverts (1903–1980), German Law professor
 Thomas Sieverts (born 1934), German architect

See also 
 Sievert (disambiguation)